This is a list of beer festivals in the Black Country that occur regularly, usually annually. The Black Country is a region in the Midlands of England. Although its boundaries are not precisely defined, for the purposes of this list, the Black Country will be defined as the extending over the 4 Local authority areas of Wolverhampton, Dudley, Sandwell and Walsall.

List of beer festivals 

 Black Country Beer Festival. Held in Lye, usually in August. 
 Dudley Canal & Tunnel Trust Real Ale and Cider Festival. Summer event. 
 Dudley Winter Ales Fayre. Usually held towards the end of November. 
 Sedgley Real Ale and Beer Festival. 
 Stourbridge Beer Festival. Usually held in early May. 
 Walsall Beer Festival. Usually held in early March. 
 Wolverhampton Beer and Cider Festival. Usually held in June.

References

Beer festivals in the United Kingdom
Beer